Ildibad (sometimes rendered Ildebad, Ildebadus, Hildebad or Heldebadus) (died 541) was a king of the Ostrogoths in Italy in 540–541.

Biography
Ildibad was a nephew of Theudis, an Ostrogoth king of the Visigoths in Spain. This relationship led Peter Heather to suggest that both belonged to a powerful, non-royal clan. In 540, the Ostrogothic king Witiges was taken prisoner by Belisarius in Ravenna. Ildibad's children were also taken prisoner. Ildibad was one of the Goths north of the Po river who still refused to surrender to Roman authority. Following Witiges' capture, however, Ildibad had attempted to negotiate terms of surrender with Belisarius, perhaps because of the fate of his children.

After Witiges's capture, the leading candidate for the Ostrogothic throne became Uraias, who was Witiges' nephew, a skilled military commander and in charge of Ticinum (Pavia). Uraias, however, declined because his family lacked "royal fortune", and instead suggested Ildibad, who was at that time in charge of Verona. These were the only cities still held by the Ostrogoths at this time. After being elected king in 540, Ildibad moved his capital to Pavia. Ildibad again attempted to negotiate a surrender, but after Belisarius sailed to Constantinople along with Witiges and Ildibad's family, the war resumed. The Gothic territory at this time consisted only of a narrow strip of land between Pavia and Verona, while the army consisted of barely 1,000 men, although this number was growing.

The lack of coordination among the remaining Byzantine commanders enabled Ildibad to extend his authority throughout Liguria and Venetia. In 541 AD he was engaged outside the heavily defended city of Treviso by its military commander Vitalius and a sizable body of Herules. The battle was a decisive victory for the Goths, with Vitalius barely escaping while the Heruli leader was killed. His nephew Totila then became military commander of Treviso. Ildibad was subsequently able to extend his authority across the entire Po Valley. The victory gave him increased support among the Goths, while the ruinous Roman taxation of the provinces and lack of coordination among generals enabled him to acquire many Roman deserters.

In 541, Ildibad had Uraias murdered. According to Procopius, Uraias's murder had been instigated by Ildibad's wife, who felt insulted by the lavish lifestyle of Uraias' wife. Herwig Wolfram suggests that this is an invention by Procopius to "personalize" the causes of political events, and that the real reason for Uraias' murder was that the Witiges clan had allied with non-Gothic barbarians, including the Rugii and probably Gepids, to conspire against Ildibad's rule. In any case, in May 541, Ildibad was murdered at a royal banquet by his Gepid bodyguard Velas whose Gothic lover was married off to someone else by Ildibad while Velas was away. The lack of a suitable Gothic successor enabled the Rugians to make their chief Eraric king of the Goths. Eraric, however, betrayed the Goths and secretly offered to surrender the Gothic kingdom to the Byzantines in return for money. As a result, the Goths at Pavia offered Ildibad's nephew Totila the throne. Totila was at that point himself negotiating with the imperial commander at Ravenna, and demanded the killing of Eraric if he was to accept the throne. After Eraric was killed in October 541, Totila became king of the Ostrogoths, a title he held for more than ten years.

References

Sources

541 deaths
6th-century kings of Italy
6th-century monarchs in Europe
Assassinated Gothic people
6th-century murdered monarchs
Ostrogothic kings
People of the Gothic War (535–554)
Year of birth unknown
6th-century Ostrogothic people